California Newsreel, was founded in 1968 as the San Francisco branch of the national film making collective Newsreel. It is an American non-profit, social justice film distribution and production company still based in San Francisco, California. Their educational media resources include both documentary and feature films, with a focus on the advancement of racial justice and diversity, and the study of African American life and history, as well as African culture and politics. In 2006, Newsreel launched a new thematic focus for their work: Globalization, with an emphasis on the global economy and the international division of labor. Several of California Newsreel's films have been broadcast on PBS.

California Newsreel has produced a small number of films related to racial and economic justice, including Race: The Power of an Illusion (2003), and UNNATURAL CAUSES: Is Inequality Making Us Sick? (2008) a new video series The Raising of America: Early Childhood and the Future of Our Nation is scheduled for release in 2015.

Film and video collections
The Library of African Cinema: Films from Africa made by Africans, offering restorative images and a new film language. Several of the newest releases touch upon issues such as war, human rights and the AIDS pandemic.

 African American Perspectives:  The video resources in this collection provide historical, cultural, political and sociological chronicles about the people and events that have shaped America from slavery to present day. This collection aims to provide a context for understanding current issues of race and prejudice.

 Globalization: These films examine the impact of neo-liberal economic policies on labor, trade, health, culture and the environment. Their globalization videos are intended to serve as analytical educational tools, offering alternative views to mainstream coverage of global economic issues.

 Health and Social Justice: Starting with the cornerstone release of UNNATURAL CAUSES: Is Inequality Making Us Sick? (2008) which attempts to frame the conversation around social determinants of health, this video collection looks at the ways socioeconomic and racial inequities effect health outcomes in the United States and abroad.

See also
 Third World Newsreel
 The Newsreel

References

External links
California Newsreel official site
The Library of African Cinema collection
African American Perspectives collection
Globalization collection
Health and Social Justice collection
The Unnatural Causes website
The Raising of America website
The Original PBS RACE - The Power of an Illusion website
The new RACE - The Power of an Illusion companion website

Film organizations in the United States
Film archives in the United States
Mass media companies established in 1968
Non-profit organizations based in San Francisco
Cinema of the San Francisco Bay Area
Counterculture of the 1960s